This page is a list of the steam locomotives in Slovenia. Numerous steam locomotives are plinthed across the country. In addition there are locomotives on display at Slovenian Railway Museum.

List

References

External links

 Another List
 Museum Stock List

 
Steam locomotives
Steam locomotives, Slovenia